The Second Archipelago Expedition was an expedition by the Russian Baltic Fleet under Admiral Dmitry Senyavin into the Mediterranean between 1805 and 1807. It formed part of the War of the Third Coalition, War of the Fourth Coalition and the Russo-Turkish War (1806–12). The Russian fleet defeated the Turkish fleet in the Dardanelles and at the Battle of Athos and – in combination with Russian land successes on the Danube and in the Caucasus – the campaign forced the Ottoman Empire to conclude a truce with Russia in August 1807. After the conclusion of the Peace of Tilsit with Napoleon, the Russian Navy lifted its blockade of the Dardanelles and returned to the Baltic.

Notes

External links
https://web.archive.org/web/20100412052433/http://milistory.ho.ua/istor2/map1805-11/Adriatich_1806-7.htm

1805
1806
1807
Campaigns of the Napoleonic Wars
Russo-Turkish wars
War of the Third Coalition
History of the Aegean Sea